The UFV Cascades are the athletic teams that represent the University of the Fraser Valley in Abbotsford, British Columbia and currently compete in the Canada West conference of U Sports. The Cascades field varsity teams in basketball, golf, soccer, and volleyball.

History
The Cascades had exclusively been a member of the PacWest conference of the Canadian Collegiate Athletic Association until 2006 when they were granted probationary membership into the Canada West conference of the then-named Canadian Interuniversity Sport. Basketball and soccer began competing in Canada West in the 2006-07 season. The Cascades became full members of Canada West in 2010. More of the school's varsity programs moved from the PacWest of the CCAA to Canada West of U Sports until both volleyball teams' move for the 2020-21 season meant that all varsity teams were competing in U SPORTS.

Varsity teams

Men's basketball
In 2000, the men's basketball team captured its first PacWest conference championship after earning bronze medals in 1998 and 1999. The team again won conference bronze in 2001, but returned to conference championship gold medal winners in 2002, 2004, and 2006, with 2006 being their last as members of the PacWest. The team moved to the Canada West conference in 2006.

On March 26, 2020, Parm Bains, Daniel Adediran, and Kenan Hadzovic became the first UFV players to be selected in the Canadian Elite Basketball League Draft when they were all selected in the first, second, and third rounds, respectively, in the 2020 CEBL–U Sports Draft by the Fraser Valley Bandits.

Women's basketball
The Cascades women's basketball program has historically been one of the strongest at the school. While playing in the PacWest of the CCAA, the team won ten conference championships including five consecutively from 2001 to 2005. The team also won seven silver medals in the PacWest conference championship tournament. Following their move to U Sports in 2006, the program remained competitive, although have not yet won a conference championship. The team has, however, qualified for the National Final 8 Tournament twice, in 2013 and 2014, claiming a bronze medal finish in 2014.

Golf
The Cascades competed in the PacWest conference of the Canadian Collegiate Athletic Association until 2019 when the team moved to the Canada West conference of U Sports for the 2019-2020 season.

Men's Soccer
The Cascades men's soccer team won one conference championship, coming in 1996, while playing in the PacWest conference of the CCAA. The team also had one silver and one bronze finish. The program joined the Canada West conference of U Sports in 2006.

Women's Soccer
The Cascades women's soccer team had three silver medal conference finishes and as well as three bronze medals while playing in the PacWest conference of the CCAA. The program joined the Canada West conference of U Sports in 2006 and claimed their one conference championship in 2010.

Volleyball
The men's and women's volleyball teams originally competed in the PacWest conference of the CCAA for two seasons from 1983 to 1985. Both programs were brought back in 2004 and continued to compete in the CCAA. On May 7, 2019, the Canada West conference of U Sports approved the admission of the Cascades' men's and women's volleyball teams for the 2020-21 season.

Men's volleyball
The Cascades men's volleyball team won four conference silver medals and two conference bronze medals over their 18 years in the PacWest conference of the CCAA. The team also made two appearances in the national championship tournament in 2007 and 2009. The team became a U Sports member starting with the 2020-21 season.

Women's volleyball
The Cascades women's volleyball team has claimed one CCAA national championship, in 2013, as well as earning a bronze medal at the championship tournament in 2012.  PacWest conference championship  The program has also featured one gold medal conference champion, also in 2013, as well as yielding one conference silver medal team and four conference bronze medal teams. After 18 years of playing in the CCAA, the team moved to the Canada West conference of U Sports for the 2020-21 season.

References

External links
 

University of the Fraser Valley
U Sports teams